Sung-yong, also spelled Seng-yong in the Yale transcription system or Seong-yong in Revised Romanization, is a Korean masculine given name. Its meaning differs based on the hanja used to write each syllable of the name.

Hanja
There are 27 hanja with the reading "sung" and 24 hanja with the reading "yong" on the South Korean government's official list of hanja which may be registered for use in given names. Additionally, there is one character with the reading "ryong" which may also be written and pronounced "yong" in South Korea. Some ways of writing this name in hanja include:

 (이룰 성 yirul seong, 날랠 용 nallael yong): "becoming brave"
 (이룰 성 yirul seong, 용 룡/용 용 yong ryong/yong yong): "becoming the dragon"; also spelled Seong-ryong or Sung-ryong. This is the second half of the four-character idiom mangjaseongryong (望子成龍), meaning "hope for one's son to become a dragon".
 (정성 성 jeongseong seong, 떳떳할 용 ddeotddeothal yong): "sincere and honourable"

People
People with this name include:

Ryu Seong-ryong (1542–1607), Joseon Dynasty scholar-official
Woo Sung-yong (born 1974), South Korean football coach and former forward
Choi Sung-yong (born 1975), South Korean football midfielder
Jung Sung-ryong (born 1985), South Korean football goalkeeper
Kim Seng-yong (born 1987), Zainichi Korean football striker with North Korean citizenship
Ki Sung-yueng (born 1989), South Korean football midfielder

See also
List of Korean given names
Nam Sung-yong (1912–2001), Korean marathon runner of the Japanese colonial period, whose given name is spelled "Seung-ryong" (승룡) in Revised Romanisation

References

Korean masculine given names